Juan Francisco García may refer to:

Juanfran (footballer, born 1976) (Juan Francisco García García), Spanish footballer
Juan Francisco García (boxer) (1953–2023), Mexican boxer
Juan Francisco García (composer) (1892–1972), Dominican merengue composer
Juan Francisco García Peña (born 1989), Spanish footballer

See also 
Juan Garcia (disambiguation)